Nicolaus Hieronymus Gundling (February 25, 1671 – December 9, 1729), was a German jurist and eclectic philosopher. He was born in Kirchensittenbach, and died in Magdeburg.  He was the brother of Jacob Paul von Gundling, Court Historiographer to King Frederick I of Prussia, who became a figure of ridicule in the "Tobacco Cabinet" (Tabakskollegium) of Frederick William I.

Son of a pastor, Gundling studied in Altdorf, Jena, Leipzig and Halle. In 1702 he entered into controversy with Gotthard Heidegger, who had raised fears about the effect on German life of the French fashion for the novel. In 1705 he became professor of philosophy at Halle, and in 1707 he became professor of jurisprudence there.

Works

Dissertatio de statu naturali Hobbesii, 1706
 Ioannes Casa an paiderastìas crimen defenderit, in: Observationes selectae ad rem litterariam spectantes, Renger, Halae 1707, vol. 1, pp. 120–136.
Politica seu prudentia civilis ratione connexa, exemplis illustrata, 1732
Ausführlicher Discours über den jetzigen Zustand der europäischen Staaten, 1733/4

References

External links

1671 births
1729 deaths
Jurists from Bavaria
German male writers
Martin Luther University of Halle-Wittenberg alumni
Academic staff of the Martin Luther University of Halle-Wittenberg
University of Altdorf alumni
17th-century German jurists
Privy counsellors
Philosophers of law
18th-century German philosophers
18th-century German lawyers